A sanctuary area is a type of New Zealand protected area. They exist to preserve populations of important forest types, like the remnants of Kauri forests in Northland.

Sanctuary areas are relatively rare. Like ecological areas, most sanctuary areas were set aside by the now defunct New Zealand Forest Service in the 1970s and 1970s in response to activism by the conservationist movement.

The 9,105-hectare Waipoua Forest Sanctuary, featuring giant Kauri like Tāne Mahuta, was established as the first Sanctuary Area in 1952. The Whirinaki Sanctuary, created in the 1980s to protect the podocarp forests of Whirinaki Forest Park, was one of the last to be established.

The Land Information New Zealand website lists 10 sanctuary areas recognised by the New Zealand Geographic Board:

 Te Arai Sanctuary, Northland
 Wairaki Forest Sanctuary, Auckland
 Otawa Sanctuary Area, Bay of Plenty, Bay of Plenty
 Sugar Loaf Islands Sanctuary, Taranaki
 Ngā Motu / Sugar Loaf Islands Sanctuary, Taranaki
 Oapui Sanctuary, Taranaki
 Erua Forest Sanctuary, Manawatū-Whanganui
 Esk Kiwi Sanctuary, Hawke's Bay
 Hihitahi Forest Sanctuary, Manawatū-Whanganui
 Rocky Hills Sanctuary Area, Wellington

References

Protected areas of New Zealand
Lists of tourist attractions in New Zealand
New Zealand environment-related lists